"God Bless America" is a patriotic song written by Irving Berlin.

God Bless America may also refer to:

 God Bless America (LeAnn Rimes album), 2001
 God Bless America (charity album), a 2001 compilation album of patriotic songs by Columbia Records artists
 God Bless America (film), a 2011 dark comedy film by Bobcat Goldthwait
 "God Bless America" (Orange Is the New Black), a 2019 television episode

See also
 "God Bless Amerika", a 2013 song by Lil Wayne
 "God Bless the U.S.A.", a 1984 song by Lee Greenwood